Maurice Meersman (17 February 1922 – 13 December 2008) was a Belgian racing cyclist. He rode in the 1948 Tour de France.

References

External links

1922 births
2008 deaths
Belgian male cyclists
Cyclists from West Flanders
People from Dentergem
20th-century Belgian people